Vytautas Pranas Bičiūnas  (August 20, 1893 in Klovainiai – October 30, 1943 in Sverdlovsk) was a Lithuanian painter, theatre actor, writer and literary critic.

Between 1914 and 1916, he studied at Kazan Art School. Then in 1917, along with Juozas Tumas-Vaižgantas, he edited the newspaper Lietuviu Balsas (The Lithuanian Voice)

See also
List of Lithuanian painters

References
This article was initially translated from the Lithuanian Wikipedia.

1893 births
1943 deaths
20th-century Lithuanian painters
20th-century Lithuanian male actors
Lithuanian male stage actors
People from Pakruojis District Municipality